Summerville Cemetery is a cemetery in Augusta, Georgia. It is maintained by the City of Augusta.

Notable interments
 George Walker Crawford (1798–1872), Governor of Georgia, US Secretary of War
 Alfred Cumming (1828–1910), Confederate Army general
 Alfred Cumming (1802–1873), Governor of Utah
 Alfred Cuthbert (1785–1856), US Senator

 William Henry Fleming (1855–1944), US Congressman
 Charles Jones Jenkins (1805–1883), Supreme Court of Georgia Justice, Governor of Georgia, candidate for Vice President and for President of the United States
 John Pendleton King (1799–1888), US Senator
 Joseph Rucker Lamar (1857–1916), Associate Justice in the US Supreme Court
 John Milledge (1757–1818), US Congressman and Senator, Attorney General and Governor of Georgia

References

External links
 
 

Cemeteries in Georgia (U.S. state)
Geography of Augusta, Georgia
Protected areas of Richmond County, Georgia
Tourist attractions in Augusta, Georgia